The 2005 WGC-American Express Championship was a professional golf tournament held October 6–9 at Harding Park Golf Course in San Francisco, California. It was the sixth WGC-American Express Championship tournament, and the third of three World Golf Championships events held in 2005.

World number 1 Tiger Woods won the tournament to capture his fourth WGC-American Express Championship and his tenth World Golf Championships title. Woods defeated John Daly on the second hole of a playoff when Daly missed a two-foot (0.6 m) putt for par.

Round summaries

First round
Thursday, October 6, 2005

Second round
Friday, October 7, 2005

Third round
Saturday, October 8, 2005

Final round
Sunday, October 9, 2005

Scorecard

Cumulative tournament scores, relative to par

Source:

Playoff

The sudden-death playoff began on the 18th hole (468 yd.) and ended on the 16th hole (336 yd.).

Scorecard

Cumulative sudden-death playoff scores, relative to par

References

External links
Coverage from the European Tour's official site

WGC Championship
Golf in California
WGC-American Express Championship
WGC-American Express Championship
WGC-American Express Championship
WGC-American Express Championship